Nancy Ann Kerrigan (born October 13, 1969) is an American figure skater and actress. She won bronze medals at the 1991 World Championships and the 1992 Winter Olympics, silver medals at the 1992 World Championships and the 1994 Winter Olympics, as well as the 1993 US National Figure Skating Championship.  Kerrigan was inducted into the United States Figure Skating Hall of Fame in 2004.

On January 6, 1994, an assailant used a police baton to strike Kerrigan on her landing knee; the attacker was hired by the ex-husband of her rival Tonya Harding. The attack injured Kerrigan, but she quickly recovered. Harding and Kerrigan both participated in the 1994 Winter Olympics, but after the Games, Harding was permanently banned from competitive figure skating. At the Olympics, Kerrigan won the silver medal in a controversial showdown with gold medal winner Oksana Baiul. She then started touring and performed with several ice skating troupes that included Champions on Ice and Broadway on Ice. In 2017, she was a contestant on Dancing with the Stars.

Early life 
Kerrigan was born in Stoneham, Massachusetts, the youngest child and only daughter of welder Daniel Kerrigan (1939–2010) and homemaker Brenda Kerrigan (née Schultz, b. 1940). She is of English, Irish and German ancestry, and has stated: "There's very little Irish in me, just my name." While her brothers Michael and Mark played hockey, she took up figure skating at age six. She did not start private lessons until age eight and won her first competition, the Boston Open, at age nine.

Kerrigan's family was of modest means. Her father sometimes worked three jobs to fund her skating career; he also drove the Zamboni at the local rink in exchange for Nancy's lessons. Kerrigan was coached by Theresa Martin until she was 16, then began working with Evy and Mary Scotvold after a brief period with Denise Morrissey. The Scotvolds remained her coaches through the rest of her competitive career.

Skating career 
Kerrigan began to reach prominence at the national level when she placed fourth at the junior level at the 1987 U.S. Figure Skating Championships. She made an early impression as a strong jumper, but was comparatively weak in compulsory figures. She made her senior debut the following season, moving up the national rankings each year: 12th in 1988, fifth in 1989, and fourth in 1990. She continued to be held back by compulsory figures until they were eliminated from competitions after the 1990 season.

1991–1993 competitions 
Kerrigan's rise at the national level continued when she placed third at the 1991 U.S. Figure Skating Championships. She qualified for the 1991 World Figure Skating Championships, where she won the bronze medal. Her medal was part of the first-ever sweep of the women's podium by a single country at the World Championships, as her teammates Kristi Yamaguchi and Tonya Harding won gold and silver, respectively.

In the 1992 season, Kerrigan again improved on her placement at the previous year's national championships by finishing second. She won a bronze medal (Yamaguchi took the gold) in the 1992 Winter Olympics and earned the silver medal at the 1992 World Championships.

The following season—with Yamaguchi retired from eligible competition—Kerrigan became United States champion, even though her performance was flawed. She admitted that she would have to improve her skating in time for the World Championships. She won the short program at the World Championships in Prague, but had a disastrous free skate that resulted in her tumbling to fifth in the standings. This was followed by an even worse performance at a televised pro-am event, where Kerrigan fell three times, botched the landing of another jump, and appeared dazed and depressed, losing to 1988 Olympian Caryn Kadavy.

Before and after the 1992 Olympics, she had many corporate sponsorship contracts (with companies such as Campbell's Soup, Evian, Reebok, and Seiko) and opportunities to perform professionally, which were permitted after the International Skating Union abolished the earlier strict amateur status rules that had governed eligibility for the sport. In preparation for the 1994 Winter Olympics, she curtailed these activities to focus on her training, instead. She also began working with a sports psychologist to better handle her nerves in competition.

1994 assault 

On January 6, 1994, at the U.S. Figure Skating Championships in Detroit, Kerrigan was the victim of a crime that brought her international fame far beyond the skating world. As she was walking through a corridor at Cobo Arena immediately after a practice session, Kerrigan was bludgeoned on the right lower thigh with a police baton by an assailant, who was later apprehended and identified as Shane Stant. The assault was planned by rival Tonya Harding's ex-husband Jeff Gillooly and co-conspirator Shawn Eckardt (1967–2007). The conspirators' goal was to prevent Kerrigan from competing in both the National Championships and the Lillehammer 1994 Olympics.

The attack's immediate aftermath was recorded on a TV camera and broadcast around the world. The initial footage showed the attendants helping Kerrigan as she grabbed at her knee, crying out: "Why, why, why?" Kerrigan was also seen being carried away by her father Daniel. Harding won the championship, with Michelle Kwan second. Although Kerrigan's injury forced her to withdraw from the U.S. Championships, her fellow skaters agreed that she merited one of the two spots on the Olympic team. The USFSA chose to name her to the Olympic team rather than Kwan, who was sent to Lillehammer as an alternate in the event that Harding was removed from the team.

Kerrigan recovered quickly from her injury and resumed her intensive training. She practiced by doing complete back-to-back, double run-throughs of her programs until she felt completely confident in her ability to compete under pressure. The fame she had acquired from the attack led to further opportunities; she was reported to have already signed endorsement contracts for $9.5 million before the Olympics began.

Harding denied any involvement in the planning of the attack but later pleaded guilty to conspiring to hinder the prosecution. In late 2005, Kerrigan expressed objections to Shane Stant's wishes to have the attack removed from his record so he could join the Navy SEALs, which do not recruit anyone with a felony conviction. Kerrigan stated in a letter dated November 25, 2005, that "to allow Stant to have the attack removed from his record would not only be an insult to [her], but it [also] would send the message that a crime like that can ultimately be swept under the rug." Stant's request had already been denied by a judge, saying that it is against the law to expunge an assault conviction. Stant was 34 when he tried to remove the attack from his record.

The attack was depicted in the 2017 film, I, Tonya.

1994 Winter Olympics 

The ladies single skating event of the 1994 Winter Olympics in the Hamar Olympic Amphitheatre took place seven weeks after the attack, and Kerrigan skated what she considered to be the best two performances of her life in the short program and free skate. She won the silver medal, finishing second to Oksana Baiul and ahead of Chen Lu as Tonya Harding finished in eighth place amid controversy. Harding had trouble with her equipment (the laces on her skates) and was given a reskate by the judges. Kerrigan was in first place after the short program, but lost the free skate and the gold medal to Baiul in a close and controversial 5–4 decision.

Kerrigan appeared to display dissatisfaction and disappointment with her second-place finish. While Kerrigan and Chen waited over 20 minutes for Olympic officials to find a copy of the Ukrainian national anthem, someone mistakenly told Kerrigan the delay in the presentation was because Baiul had cried off her make-up and was getting it retouched. Kerrigan, with obvious frustration, was caught on-camera saying, "Oh, come on. So she's going to get out here and cry again. What's the difference?" CBS chose to air the undiplomatic comment. This marked a distinct shift in the way Kerrigan was portrayed in the media, which had been somewhat protective of her image up to that point because of the attack against her.

Kerrigan elected not to attend the closing ceremonies at the Olympics. Her agent claimed this was because Norwegian security had advised her to leave due to death threats that had been made against her, but this was later denied. Instead, she left Norway early to take part in a prearranged publicity parade at Walt Disney World, her $2 million sponsor.

1994 Walt Disney World parade 
Following the 1994 Winter Olympics, Kerrigan participated in a Walt Disney World parade. She was caught on microphone saying to Mickey Mouse, "This is dumb. I hate it. This is the corniest thing I have ever done." She later said that her remark was taken out of context and she was not commenting on being in the parade but rather on her agent's insistence that she wear her silver medal in the parade. She said that her parents had always taught her not to show off or brag about her accomplishments. She added that she had nothing against Disney or Mickey Mouse: "Who could find fault with Mickey Mouse? He's the greatest mouse I've ever known."

Commenting on the media backlash, Mike Barnicle of The Boston Globe said, "Now the thing is over so we've got to kill her. That's us [the media], not her." Either because of the bad publicity or her own inclinations, some of Kerrigan's previously announced endorsements and television deals were dropped after the Olympics.

Skating results

Skating honors 
Kerrigan was inducted into the United States Figure Skating Hall of Fame in 2004. She was also honored at Ice Theatre of New York's annual benefit gala in 2008.

Skating Outfits 
Kerrigan's Olympic skating outfits were designed by fashion designer Vera Wang. Along with Christian Lacroix's designs for Surya Bonaly in 1992, Wang's designs marked a new trend toward couture in figure skating. Kerrigan's white 1992 free-skating costume resembled a wedding dress with sheer illusion sleeves and a basketweave design on the bodice. Kerrigan's 1994 Olympic dresses were also designed by Wang. She wore another white dress trimmed with black velvet bands and sheer black sleeves for the original program and a champagne-colored dress set with 11,500 rhinestones for the free skate. Wang donated those two dresses to Kerrigan, the values of which were estimated at $9,600 and $13,000, respectively.

Post-Olympic skating career 
Kerrigan turned professional after the Olympics. She appeared in a few competitions such as Ice Wars, but focused her career on performing in a variety of ice shows. She has appeared in Champions on Ice, Broadway on Ice, and an ice show adaptation of the musical Footloose, among other productions.

In 2003, Kerrigan became a national spokeswoman for Fight for Sight.

Television, movies and video games

In the 1994 TV movie Tonya and Nancy: The Inside Story, she was portrayed by Heather Langenkamp. Years later, Langenkamp commented: "Good girls always get short shrift in this society, we want the story to be about the bad girl. I can't imagine a more admirable character than Nancy Kerrigan and it's too bad we don't make movies about people like that. People consider good girls boring, unfortunately".

In 1994, Kerrigan hosted Saturday Night Live, season 19 episode 15, featuring musical guest Aretha Franklin.

In Tattoo Assassins, a Mortal Kombat-style arcade fighting video game developed in 1994 by Data East (the release of which was cancelled, though rare, nearly-complete prototypes are in existence), one character the player can fight as is heavily based on Kerrigan. Namely, the figure-skater "Karla Keller" played by Cristine Dupree. Keller's backstory as given in the game itself has her as an Olympic hopeful but in a fictionalized version of the assault on Kerrigan, Keller's rival and fellow figure-skater "Eva Gunter" (a fictional version of Tonya Harding) attacks her late at night and injures her so much that Keller is forced to pull out of the Olympics. Since then, Keller trains in martial arts so she can one day take revenge on Gunter by beating her up. In the game, Karla Keller is dressed in full figure-skater attire (even wearing ice-skates) and like all other fighters in the game, has magical tattoos on her skin that come alive when the player performs special attacks and finishing moves.

In 1995, Kerrigan had a guest appearance on Boy Meets World in the episode "Wrong Side of the Track" where she helps Eric Matthews discover his potential for skating in a dream sequence.

In 2004, Kerrigan sang a cover of "The Best" for a Tina Turner tribute album.

Kerrigan appeared in the Fox television program Skating with Celebrities (2006) and played a small part in the ice-skating comedy feature film Blades of Glory (2007) with Will Ferrell. She hosted Nancy Kerrigan's World of Skating on the Comcast Network starting in 2005, and has done commentary work for other skating broadcasts.

During the 2010 Winter Olympics, Kerrigan served as a "special correspondent" for Entertainment Tonight.

She has written an instructional book on advanced figure-skating technique, Artistry on Ice.

In 2014, ESPN aired The Price of Gold, a 30 for 30 documentary about the 1994 attack. On February 23, 2014, NBC aired a documentary during the 2014 Winter Olympics on the incident called Nancy & Tonya.

On July 10, 2016, Kerrigan competed against Kayla Harrison on the "Battle of the Olympians" episode of the television program, Flea Market Flip (S7 E2)

On March 1, 2017, Kerrigan was named as one of the contestants who would compete on season 24 of Dancing with the Stars. She was paired with professional dancer Artem Chigvintsev. Despite receiving higher judges' scores than Bonner Bolton and David Ross, Kerrigan and Chigvintsev were eliminated during a double elimination in the seventh week of the competition.

In November 2017, she appeared on Keeping Up with the Kardashians in the Christmas special episode.

In December 2017, a fictional movie about Tonya Harding and the attack on Kerrigan, entitled I, Tonya, was released; Caitlin Carver played Kerrigan.

In January 2018, Kerrigan joined Inside Edition as their Super Bowl correspondent. She also appeared in an episode of Fresh Off the Boat as herself. In 2021, she played a voice role in the animated Easter movie, Eggs.

Personal life 
Kerrigan graduated from Stoneham High School and attended Emmanuel College in Boston to study business. She created the Nancy Kerrigan Foundation, which aims to raise awareness and support for the vision-impaired. Her mother Brenda is legally blind.

Kerrigan married her agent Jerry Solomon on September 9, 1995, the year after she retired from competition. The marriage was her first and his third. They have three children together: Matthew (born 1996), Brian (born 2005), and Nicole (born 2008). Solomon also has a son from his second marriage. In April 2017, Kerrigan said that she had six miscarriages in eight years, while attempting to have her three children. She said that the miscarriages were "devastating" and "a strain" on the marriage.

References

External links 
 
 
 
 
 Washington Post article on the 1994 attack
 People Magazine article 1994 entitled "Poisoned Ice"

1969 births
Living people
American female single skaters
American people of English descent
American people of German descent
American people of Irish descent
American victims of crime
Emmanuel College (Massachusetts) alumni
Figure skaters at the 1992 Winter Olympics
Figure skaters at the 1994 Winter Olympics
Medalists at the 1992 Winter Olympics
Medalists at the 1994 Winter Olympics
Olympic bronze medalists for the United States in figure skating
Olympic medalists in figure skating
Olympic silver medalists for the United States in figure skating
People from Stoneham, Massachusetts
People from Woburn, Massachusetts
Sportspeople from Middlesex County, Massachusetts
Universiade medalists in figure skating
World Figure Skating Championships medalists
Universiade bronze medalists for the United States
Medalists at the 1989 Winter Universiade
Competitors at the 1990 Goodwill Games
21st-century American women